Thompson Water, Carr and Common is a  biological Site of Special Scientific Interest north of Thetford in Norfolk. Most of it is managed by the Norfolk Wildlife Trust as Thompson Common. It is a Nature Conservation Review site, Grade I, and part of the Norfolk Valley Fens Special Area of Conservation. It is crossed by the Great Eastern Pingo Trail   Local Nature Reserve.

This grassland site in the valley of a tributary of the River Wissey has a number of pingos, damp and water filled depressions formed by the melting of ice at the end of the last glaciation. It also has a lake called Thompson Water which, together with its surrounding reedswamp, is important for breeding birds.

The site is open to the public.

References

Sites of Special Scientific Interest in Norfolk
Norfolk Wildlife Trust
Nature Conservation Review sites
Special Areas of Conservation in England